Muhammad Fakhrurazi bin Musa (born 26 September 1991) is a Malaysian footballer who plays for Terengganu II in Malaysia Premier League as a midfielder.

Career statistics

Club

References

External links
 

1991 births
Living people
Malaysian footballers
Terengganu FC players
Terengganu F.C. II players
People from Terengganu
Malaysian people of Malay descent
Association football midfielders